This is a list of the 324 members of the 9th legislature of the Italian Senate. They were elected on the 1983 general election.

Senators for life are marked with a "(L)"

Christian Democracy

Italian Communist Party

Italian Socialist Party

Independent Left

Italian Social Movement

Italian Republican Party
Libero Gualtieri
Claudio Venanzetti
Susanna Agnelli
Quintino Antonio Cartia
Giorgio Covi
Giovanni Ferrara
Giacomo Leopizzi
Vincenzo Mondo
Biagio Pinto
Aride Rossi
Giovanni Spadolini
Leo Valiani (L)

Italian Democratic Socialist Party
Gianfranco Conti Persini
Dante Schietroma
Maurizio Pagani
Dino Riva
Salvatore Bellafiore
Cesarino Dante Cioce
Luigi Franza
Francesco Parrino
Giuseppe Saragat (L)
Renzo Sclavi

Italian Liberal Party
Giovanni Malagodi
Attilio Bastianini
Pietro Fiocchi
Giuseppe Fassino
Vincenzo Palumbo
Salvatore Valitutti

Mixed group
Carlo Bo (L)
Sergio Fontanari
Giovanni Leone (L)
Giovanni Battista Loi
Cesare Merzagora (L)
Mario Signorino

References

List
Lists of political office-holders in Italy
Lists of legislators by term
Lists of members of upper houses